Colette Janine Marchand (29 April 1925 – 5 June 2015) was a French prima ballerina and actress. She was nominated for the Academy Award for Best Supporting Actress in 1952 for her performance as Marie Charlet in Moulin Rouge, directed by John Huston.

During the height of her dance career she was considered one of the great dancers in Europe, known as Les jambes (The Legs), along with Violetta Elvin, Zizi Jeanmaire, Yvette Chauviré, Janine Charrat, and Margot Fonteyn. Marchand traveled around the world as a dancer and danced with many of the great ballet dancers of the 1940s and 1950s.

Personal life
Marchand was born in Paris, France, the daughter of Alice (née Lioret) and Roger Marchand. She began her career at the Paris Opera Ballet

She married Jacques Bazire, the musical director for the Roland Petit Ballet. She died on 5 June 2015, aged 90, and was survived by her sister, Yvonne (Marchand) Le Bras.

Career
She performed as a première ballerina on Broadway in Roland Petit's Les Ballets de Paris (1949 & 1950). In the 1950 show, Marchand performed a ballet piece titled The Boiled Egg, for which she received rave reviews. In 1951, she had a featured role in the Broadway musical Two on the Aisle, which ran for 276 performances. In the early 1950s while performing on Broadway, Marchand was featured in several magazines, including Life, and she made appearances on New York City television shows, including the Ford Star Revue, the Colgate Comedy Hour, and the Ed Sullivan Show.

In 1951, she lent her voice to Isidore Isou's Venom and Eternity. In 1952, she received a Golden Globe Award as Most Promising Newcomer - Female for her performance in Moulin Rouge as well as a nomination for the BAFTA for Most Promising Newcomer. In 1953 she was directed by Orson Welles in The Lady in the Ice. Her other film appearances were rare: Hungarian Rhapsody, Par Ordre du Tsar and the musical short Romantic Youth (also as choreographer) (all 1954).
,

Filmography

References

External links

 

1925 births
2015 deaths
20th-century French actresses
Prima ballerinas
New Star of the Year (Actress) Golden Globe winners
French film actresses
Actresses from Paris
French ballerinas
Dancers from Paris